Robert "Rob" Drummond (born February 19, 1986 in London, Ontario) is a former Canadian professional ice hockey player. He played with the Lake Erie Monsters of the AHL.

Playing career
Rob Drummond played junior hockey for the London Knights of the OHL under the coaching of former Washington Capitals Captain Dale Hunter.  He helped London win the J. Ross Robertson Cup and the Memorial Cup in 2005.  He served as Captain of the London Knights for the duration of the 2006 and 2007 seasons.

Although he went Undrafted, Drummond was signed to a contract with the Colorado Avalanche in 2007. He played with the Johnstown Chiefs of the ECHL in 2007–08 season, totaling 14 goals and 27 assists in 50 games. He added 30 PIM. Later in the 2007–08 season he moved up to the Lake Erie Monsters of the AHL playing 22 games with 2 goals, 3 assists and 8 penalty minutes.

In the 2008-09 season Drummond signed an AHL contract with the Monsters. After playing in 11 games with Lake Erie, Drummond suffered a concussion which ruled him out for the rest of the season.

Career statistics

Awards and honours

References

External links

1986 births
Living people
Ice hockey people from Ontario
Johnstown Chiefs players
Lake Erie Monsters players
London Knights players
Sportspeople from London, Ontario
Canadian ice hockey centres